The first lady of the Republic of Korea (informally referred to as FLOTROK or FLOSK), commonly known as the first lady of South Korea, is the titled held by the hostess of the presidential residence, usually the wife of the president of South Korea. 

During the administration of President Park Chung-hee, his daughter, Park Geun-hye, assumed the duties of first lady after her mother, Yuk Young-soo, was shot dead. Park Geun-hye later became President herself (the first, and to date only, female president of South Korea), but was never married while in office, so there has yet to be a first gentleman of Korea.

The current first lady is Kim Keon-hee, wife of President Yoon Suk-yeol, in office since 10 May 2022.

List of first ladies of the Republic of Korea
The following is a list of the first ladies of South Korea.

Notes

See also
First Lady
First Lady of North Korea
President of South Korea
List of presidents of South Korea
Second Lady
Second Lady of South Korea
Prime Minister of South Korea
List of prime ministers of South Korea

References

South Korea